In animation, smear frames are animation frames that create the illusion of motion blur. Smear frames are used in between key frames. This animation technique has been used since the 1940s. Smear frames are used to stylistically visualize fast movement along a path of motion.

History 
The earliest, most notable use of smear frames was in the 1942 film The Dover Boys at Pimento University. The nature of smear frames helped to reduce production costs of other motion blur techniques used in earlier cartoons.

Developed for 2D animation, smear frames did not evolve much even with the emergence of CG animated films in the 1990s. The more sophisticated, rigged style of animation for CG films was not conducive to smear frames at the time.

The earliest notable use of smear frames in a 3D computer animated film was 2012’s Hotel Transylvania, in which Genndy Tartakovsky's traditional design philosophies were used to guide the 3D shots.

Types of smear frames

Elongated inbetween 
Movement of the subject between key poses by distorting it over 1-2 frames. The term first emerged in reference to this type of smear in Richard Williams’ The Animator’s Survival Kit.

Multiples 
Duplication of the subject or parts of the subject along a path of motion. Does not distort the subject and is used for repeated actions like walk cycles.

Smear frames in different media 
While developed for 2D animation, smear frames can be seen in other mediums that employ the use of animation.

In 2D animation 
• Chuck Jones’ Roadrunner.

• An example of a smear can be found in Williams’ The Animator’s Survival Kit.

• The Legend of Korra combined slight smears with motion blur to emulate a fast motion without distorting the realistic art style.

• Animated with 2D puppetry, YouTube’s Super Science Friends used multiples as to not distort their models.

In 3D animation 
• 2012 Hotel Transylvania employed the use of both elongated in-betweens and multiples, depending on the motion of the shot.

• 2014 The Lego Movie used Lego shapes in the same color as the character to simulate a smear.

• 2018 Into the Spider-verse used squash and stretch with overlayed 2D effects to create smears.

In Stop-motion 
• Laika’s ParaNorman used 3D printed head replacements that were modeled in various smear shapes.

• Wallace and Gromit used multiples to visualize quick action.

In Video games 
Much like 3D animation, smear frames were rarely seen in early video games due to the lack of power in gaming systems. Visually stylistic games with fixed cameras were more likely to have smears.

• 1991 Sonic the Hedgehog smeared Sonic’s feet in his run cycle.

• Crash Bandicoot used multiples and blur on Crash’s spin. According to Lendenfeld, this is the first notable use of smears in a 3D game.

• 2001 Jak and Daxter used elongated inbetweens, though they were limited in how far they could distort the model.

See also 
 Inbetweening
 Morphing
 Motion blur
 Onion skinning

References

Animation techniques